The 4th constituency of the Saône-et-Loire is a French legislative constituency in the Saône-et-Loire département.

Description

The 4th constituency of the Saône-et-Loire covers the north of Chalon-sur-Saône and the eastern part of the department. Following substantial boundary changes prior to the 2012 election the seat is now entirely different in character from its predecessor.

The seat has historically been a bastion of the Socialist Party, though the new boundaries made it far more marginal and the PS candidate won by only 379 at the 2012 election.  In the 2017 election it was one of the few constituencies held by the PS, in this case by over 2,000 votes. PS strengthened their hold on the seat in 2022, winning by over 4,000 votes.

Historic Representation

Election results

2022

2017

 
 
 
 
 
 
|-
| colspan="8" bgcolor="#E9E9E9"|
|-

2012

 
 
 
 
 
 
|-
| colspan="8" bgcolor="#E9E9E9"|
|-

Sources
Official results of French elections from 2002: "Résultats électoraux officiels en France" (in French).

4